Signature Tower was a proposed skyscraper in Jakarta, Indonesia.

The tower was proposed in 2010, with developers hoping to begin construction in 2015. Planning permission for the tower was granted in late 2015. Construction was scheduled to begin in the third quarter of 2016, assuming a loan of approximately $1.5 billion could be secured. China State Construction Engineering has been appointed to construct the tower.

The planned skyscraper is a part of a  redevelopment project of (Sudirman Central Business District) SCBD, near the Semanggi Interchange and located south of Gelora Bung Karno Stadium. It is within the Golden Triangle of Jakarta, where the majority of the city's major development areas are located. When completed, the structure will include six basement floors used for parking space, while the podium will feature retail, convention and entertainment venues, with the rest of the skyscraper used as office and residential space.

Engineering and design
Due to the presence of unstable alluvial deposits within the Jakarta Basin and the seismic prone area from where the skyscraper will be built, the design must comply with seismic criteria using a probabilistic seismic hazard analysis (PSHA) defined by the Pacific Earthquake Engineering Research Center (PEER), Tall Buildings Provisions and the American Society of Civil Engineers (ASCE).

On 13 July 2017, acting governor of Jakarta Djarot Syaiful Hidayat attended a regional meeting with the developers, discussing about the UDGL (Urban Design Guide Line) and finally reached an agreement to integrate the tower with the ongoing developments of the Jakarta MRT. Djarot later sent a letter to Indonesian President Joko Widodo, requesting him to make the tower to become a national icon.

Foundation
To accommodate the basement floor levels,  had to be excavated and dewatered prior to construction. This technique also redistributes axial loads on top of the harder and denser sediment underlying the alluvium.

Structure
To withstand lateral loads, a "core-outrigger-mega-frame" system consisting of two major components will be used. The primary system will feature a composite concrete core connected to eight surrounding super columns all suspended within a network of steel outrigger trusses that spans two stories. A mega frame consisting of a network of nine belt trusses interlocking the super columns together will make up the secondary system that surrounds the primary structure. The super columns will eventually thin and slope towards the apex to match the profile of the architectural tip. The floors residing between the primary and secondary systems will feature a hybrid design consisting of concrete slabs on top of a metal deck to reduce construction time and reduce additional loads.

Indefinite postponement
In June 2018, PT Danayasa Arthatama, the company that owns and develops SCBD, announced the development of Signature Tower Jakarta had been indefinitely postponed. Tony Soesanto, the director of project development company Grahamas Adisentosa, said the company decided to postpone construction because the market for office space was not promising. He also said there was a financing problem and the company had tried to conduct a road show to attract investors or loans.

See also 

 List of tallest buildings in Indonesia
 List of tallest buildings in Jakarta
 Proposed tall buildings and structures
 List of buildings with 100 floors or more

References 

Proposed buildings and structures in Indonesia